Soyuz 27 (Union 27) was a 1978 Soviet crewed spacecraft which flew to the orbiting Salyut 6 space station, during the mission EP-1. It was the third crewed flight to the station, the second successful docking and the first visitation mission. Once docked, it marked the first time that three spacecraft were docked together.

The main function of the EP-1 mission was to swap Soyuz craft with the orbiting crew, in so doing freeing a docking port for a forthcoming supply tanker. Cosmonauts Vladimir Dzhanibekov and Oleg Makarov returned to Earth in the Soyuz 26 spacecraft after spending five days on the station. The descent module is displayed at the Sergei Pavlovich Korolyov Museum of Cosmonautics in Zhytomyr, Ukraine.

Crew

Backup crew

Mission parameters
 Mass: 
 Perigee: 
 Apogee: 
 Inclination: 51.65°
 Period: 88.73 minutes

References

External links

 

Crewed Soyuz missions
1978 in the Soviet Union
Spacecraft launched in 1978
Spacecraft which reentered in 1978
Spacecraft launched by Soyuz-U rockets